Konstantin Vladimirovich Prilous (born 6 May 1969) is a former Russian football player.

References

1969 births
Living people
Soviet footballers
Russian footballers
FC Luch Vladivostok players
Russian Premier League players
FC SKA-Khabarovsk players
FC Okean Nakhodka players
Association football defenders
FC Smena Komsomolsk-na-Amure players